Alphonso Ben Lull (1844 – February 25, 1929) was an American physician and politician who served in the Washington House of Representatives from 1889 to 1891.

Lull was born in Pennsylvania and attended the Michigan College of Medicine. He was living in Albuquerque, New Mexico, in 1888 when he was arrest on charges of desertion and adultery after his wife, who alleged he committed "improper relations" with a widow of one of his patients.

That same year he moved to Port Angeles, Washington and to California in 1908.

References

External links

1844 births
1929 deaths
Members of the Washington House of Representatives
19th-century American physicians
20th-century American physicians
Date of birth missing
People from Albuquerque, New Mexico
People from Port Angeles, Washington
Physicians from Pennsylvania